The Melrose Caverns and Harrison Farmstead is a historic property in rural Rockingham County, Virginia.  It is located at 6639 North Valley Pike (United States Route 11) north of Harrisonburg, Virginia.  The property includes a series of caves that have long been a tourist attraction, including visits by soldiers of both sides during the American Civil War.  It also includes a c. 1859 Greek Revival farmhouse, and numerous agricultural outbuildings, one of which is a log-structure summer kitchen that may be as old as 1820.

Commercial tours of the caverns were held until the 1980s, however tours continue to offered by reservation.

The property was listed on the National Register of Historic Places in 2014.

See also
National Register of Historic Places listings in Rockingham County, Virginia

References

Houses on the National Register of Historic Places in Virginia
Houses completed in 1859
Houses in Rockingham County, Virginia
National Register of Historic Places in Rockingham County, Virginia
Caves of Virginia